Malawi competed at the 2016 Summer Olympics in Rio de Janeiro, Brazil, from 5 to 21 August 2016. This was the nation's tenth appearance at the Summer Olympics. Malawi did not attend the 1976 Summer Olympics in Montreal and the 1980 Summer Olympics in Moscow, because of its support to the African and United States-led boycott.

Olympic and Commonwealth Games Association of Malawi selected a squad of five athletes, three men and two women, to compete only in track and field, swimming, and archery (the nation's Olympic debut in Rio de Janeiro) at the Games; all of them received their spots through wild card entries or Tripartite Commission invitations, without having qualified. Long-distance runner Kefasi Chitsala acted as Malawi's flag bearer in the opening ceremony. Malawi, however, has yet to win its first Olympic medal.

Archery
 
Malawi has received an invitation from the Tripartite Commission to send a male archer to the Olympic tournament, signifying the nation's Olympic debut in the sport.

Athletics (track and field)
 
Malawi has received two universality slots from IAAF to send two athletes (one male and one female) to the Olympics.

Swimming

Malawi has received a Universality invitation from FINA to send two swimmers (one male and one female) to the Olympics.

References

External links
 
 

Nations at the 2016 Summer Olympics
2016
Olympics